Ahlbeck is a village (Ortsteil) of the Heringsdorf municipality on the island of Usedom on the Baltic coast. It is the easternmost of the so-called Kaiserbäder ("Imperial Spas") seaside resorts on the German part of the island, situated right next to the border with Poland and the town of Świnoujście (Swinemünde).

First mentioned as Ahlebeck (Low German for 'eel creek') in 1693, fishermen settled the side after Usedom had passed under Brandenburg-Prussian rule upon the 1720 Treaty of Stockholm. In the 19th century, the settlement quickly rose to a stylish seaside resort.

Ahlbeck has numerous scenic houses and mansions in the German Gründerzeit style of resort architecture. The bathing resort OstseeTherme is a popular tourist attraction; close to it, there is the architecturally noteworthy Observation Tower Ahlbeck with three observation decks and an elevator.

References

External links 

Ahlbeck website 

Villages in Mecklenburg-Western Pomerania
Seaside resorts in Germany
Populated coastal places in Germany (Baltic Sea)